Allotria is a monotypic moth genus in the family Erebidae. Its only species, Allotria elonympha, the false underwing moth, is found in eastern North America. Both the genus and the species were first described by Jacob Hübner, the genus in 1823 and the species in 1818.

The wingspan is 33–44 mm. Adults are on wing from March to September.

The larvae feed on various deciduous trees, such as black gum (Nyssa sylvatica), hickory and walnut.

References

External links

 With images.

Poaphilini
Moths of North America
Monotypic moth genera